Gary Russell (born 18 September 1963) is a British freelance writer, producer and former child actor. As a writer, he is best known for his work in connection with the television series Doctor Who and its spin-offs in other media. As an actor, he is best known for playing Dick Kirrin in the British 1978 television series The Famous Five.

Biography
Russell was born in Maidenhead, Berkshire. His on-screen acting career included leading roles in the BBC's adaptation of E. Nesbit's novel The Phoenix and the Carpet as Cyril, ITV's adaptations of Enid Blyton's Famous Five novels (as Dick) and the BBC's Look & Read schools series, playing Lord Edward Dark in Dark Towers. He also spent seasons performing with Prospect Theatre Company and the Royal National Theatre.

He has written guide books, under the pseudonym Warren Martyn, to Frasier and The Simpsons for Virgin Publishing. He was editor of Doctor Who Magazine between 1992 and 1995. He was the producer for the Doctor Who licensed audio drama tie-ins at Big Finish Productions from its inception in 1998 until July 2006, when he stepped down to work for BBC Wales as a Script Editor on Doctor Who The Sarah Jane Adventures and Torchwood. He has written a number of Doctor Who spin-off novels and in 2000 co-wrote with executive producer Philip Segal the book Doctor Who: Regeneration (HarperCollins), the making-of book of the 1996 Doctor Who television movie, as well as the TV movie's novelisation in 1996.

He wrote a series of The Art of The Lord of the Rings, one per film, plus a fourth featuring material that could not be fitted into the individual volumes, and contributed to Gollum: How We Made Movie Magic with Andy Serkis. He also wrote the behind-the-scenes book on the making of the Matthew Warchus directed 2007 stage musical version of The Lord of the Rings. His behind-the-scenes book Doctor Who: The Inside Story was published in October 2006, coinciding with his joining the Doctor Who production team. His most recent reference work was also for Doctor Who; published in 2007 by BBC Books, The Doctor Who Encyclopedia is a guide to the current Doctor Who series (2005–present), which has been regularly updated (most recently in 2012) and published both in hardback and via an app. He also wrote a similar encyclopedia for Torchwood and The Torchwood Archive, a semi-fictional guide to the show. He also co-produced and directed the animated mini series The Infinite Quest and Dreamland, which tied in with the current television series of Doctor Who as well as a series of award-winning animated online games also based on the show.

In 2011, having left BBC Wales, he briefly returned to Big Finish to produce the Bernice Summerfield and Gallifrey audios, before moving to Australia and becoming the Executive Producer at animation company Planet 55 Studios. There he has overseen the development and production of a new children's sci-fi cartoon Prisoner Zero for ABC Television. He returned to the UK in 2016.

Credits

Film and TV

Stage

Bibliography

Comics
Doctor Who (in Doctor Who Magazine No. 173, 235–237, 1991, 1996, and in Radio Times issues dated 1 June 1996 – 2 March 1997)

IDW Doctor Who comic book
At the 2007 San Diego Comic Con, IDW Publishing announced their intention to publish a new series of Doctor Who comics, which will follow the adventures of the Tenth Doctor and Martha Jones. The first six issues of this series, later collected as Agent Provocateur, were scripted by Russell and published in early 2008.  He has also written a number of Torchwood strips for Titan Publishing.

Books

Directing credits

Awards 

In April 2022, Gary Russell was given the inaugural Terrance Dicks Award For Writers by the Doctor Who Appreciation Society.

References

External links

Scales of Injustice E-book on the BBC website
Interview with Russell on the BBC Doctor Who website
Interview with Russell in the Pantechnicon Magazine

1963 births
English book editors
English male child actors
English comics writers
English male film actors
English magazine editors
English science fiction writers
English male television actors
Living people
People from Maidenhead
Writers of Doctor Who novels
20th-century English novelists
21st-century British novelists